Parasaitis is a monotypic genus of  jumping spiders containing the single species, Parasaitis femoralis. It was first described by E. B. Bryant in 1950, and is only found on the Greater Antilles. The name is a combination of the Ancient Greek "para", meaning "alongside", and the salticid genus Saitis.

References

Endemic fauna of Jamaica
Monotypic Salticidae genera
Salticidae
Spiders of the Caribbean